1111 Stone Church Road is a historic house located at the address of the same name in Junius, Seneca County, New York.

Description and history 
It is a vernacular Federal/Greek Revival style, cobblestone farmhouse. It is a two-story, five bay wide structure, with a one-story, gable-roofed former kitchen wing. It was built in the late 1820s / early 1830s and is constructed of slightly irregularly sized and variously colored field cobbles. The house is among the approximately 18 surviving cobblestone buildings in Seneca County.

It was listed on the National Register of Historic Places on September 28, 2007.

See also
 Cobblestone Farmhouse at 1229 Birdsey Road
 Cobblestone Farmhouse at 1027 Stone Church Road
 John Graves Cobblestone Farmhouse

References

Houses on the National Register of Historic Places in New York (state)
Federal architecture in New York (state)
Cobblestone architecture
Houses completed in 1830
Houses in Seneca County, New York
1830 establishments in New York (state)
National Register of Historic Places in Seneca County, New York